The 1936 Missouri Tigers football team was an American football team that represented the University of Missouri in the Big Six Conference (Big 6) during the 1936 college football season. The team compiled a 6–2–1 record (3–1–1 against Big 6 opponents), finished in second place in the Big 6, and outscored all opponents by a combined total of 107 to 74. Don Faurot was the head coach for the second of 19 seasons. The team played its home games at Memorial Stadium in Columbia, Missouri.

The team's leading scorer was Jack Frye with 36 points.

Schedule

References

Missouri
Missouri Tigers football seasons
Missouri Tigers football